Holzthum is a village in the commune of Consthum, in northern Luxembourg.  , the village has a population of 294.

References 

Consthum
Villages in Luxembourg